Franchi may refer to:

People 
Alberto Herrera Franchi  (1874–1954), Cuban general and provisional President of Cuba
Aldo Franchi (born 1882), Italian race car driver
Alessandro Franchi (cardinal) (1819–1878), Italian cardinal and archbishop
Alessandro Franchi (painter) (1838–1914), Italian painter
Andrea Franchi (1335-1401), Italian Roman Catholic member of the Order of Preachers and Bishop of Pistoia
Anna Franchi (1867-1954), Italian novelist, translator, playwright and journalist
Antonio Franchi (1638–1709), Italian painter of the 17th Century
Antonio Franchi (cyclist) (1936–2019), Italian racing cyclist
Artemio Franchi (1922–1983), President of the Italian Football Federation
Ausonio Franchi (1821–1895), Italian philosopher
Carlo Franchi (composer) (1743–1779), Italian composer
Carlo Franchi (1938–2021), Italian racing driver, known as Gimax
Dany Franchi (born 1990), Italian blues guitarist, singer and songwriter
Dorothea Anne Franchi (1920–2003), New Zealand pianist, harpist, music educator and composer
Elena Franchi (born 1996), Italian professional racing cyclist
Franco Franchi (cyclist) (born 1923), Italian racing cyclist
Franco Franchi (1928–1992), Italian comedian
Garry Franchi (born 1983), French professional football player
Giovannina Franchi (1807–1872), Italian Roman Catholic professed religious 
Giuseppe Franchi (1731–1806), Italian Neoclassical sculptor
Gregory "Greg" Franchi (born 1982), Belgian racing driver
Jan Martínez Franchi (born 1998), Argentine volleyball player
John Franchi (born 1982), retired American mixed martial artist
Lorenzo Franchi (c. 1563-c. 1630), Italian painter
Morena Franchi (born (1993), Argentine female volleyball player
Rossello di Jacopo Franchi (c. 1377–c. 1456), Italian painter
Rudy Franchi (born 1939, American writer and editor
Sergio Franchi (1926–1990), Italian-American tenor and actor

Buildings 
Stadio Artemio Franchi, a football stadium in Florence, Italy
Stadio Artemio Franchi – Montepaschi Arena, a football stadium in Siena, Italy

Firearms 
Franchi SPAS-12, a combat shotgun
Franchi SPAS-15, a dual-mode 12 gauge combat shotgun
Franchi AL-48, a semi-automatic shotgun
Franchi LF-57, a pressed-metal submachine gun

Other uses 
Artemio Franchi Trophy, an international football competition
Franchi (firearms), an Italian firearms company

See also 
Saint-Franchy, Nièvre department, France

Italian-language surnames